Horná Lehota is a village and municipality in Brezno District, in the Banská Bystrica Region of central Slovakia.

History
In historical records, the village was first mentioned in 1406 (Superior Lehota). It belonged to the castle of Slovenská Ľupča.

Famous people
Samo Chalupka, writer

Genealogical resources

The records for genealogical research are available at the state archive "Statny Archiv in Banska Bystrica, Slovakia"

 Roman Catholic church records (births/marriages/deaths): 1708-1923 (parish A)
 Lutheran church records (births/marriages/deaths): 1784-1927 (parish A)

See also
 List of municipalities and towns in Slovakia

References

External links
http://www.e-obce.sk/obec/hornalehota/horna-lehota.html
https://web.archive.org/web/20061117040130/http://www.hornalehota.sk/index.htm
https://web.archive.org/web/20060429155953/http://www.nizketatry.sk/obce/hlehota/hlehota.html
Surnames of living people in Horna Lehota

Villages and municipalities in Brezno District